Asterix and the Magic Cauldron is a computer game for the Amstrad CPC, Commodore 64 and ZX Spectrum home computers based on the popular French Asterix comic books. The game was released in 1986. In North America, the Commodore 64 version was released as Ardok the Barbarian, without the Asterix license.

Asterix and the Magic Cauldron is a graphical adventure game, where the player takes the role of Asterix, who has to find all the pieces of the missing cauldron, so that Getafix the druid can brew magic potion and the Gaulish village can stand against the Romans.

The game takes place in several interconnected "rooms", each of which take up one screen. The game starts at the Gaulish village, and Asterix can also travel out to the forest, and to Roman camps. When Asterix meets a wild boar or a Roman legionary, a separate fight scene ensues. Defeated wild boar can be eaten to provide extra sustenance.

References

External links

1986 video games
Amstrad CPC games
Commodore 64 games
ZX Spectrum games
Video games based on Asterix
Video games developed in Australia
Single-player video games